The resource calendar is the timetable that shows how material and labor are consumed during the course of a project. This data might be at activity or project level.

Project schedule  
Making a schedule relies on upon knowledge of every individual's accessibility and schedule limits, including:
 Time zones 
 Work hours
 Get-away time

See also
 Schedule (project management)
 Project planning
 Resource allocation

References

External links
 Creating Resource Calendars

Time management
Schedule (project management)